Mitochondrial import inner membrane translocase subunit Tim13 is an enzyme that in humans is encoded by the TIMM13 gene.

Function 

This gene encodes a translocase with similarity to yeast mitochondrial proteins that are involved in the import of metabolite transporters from the cytoplasm and into the mitochondrial inner membrane. The encoded protein and the TIMM8a protein form a 70 kDa complex in the intermembrane space. This gene is in a head-to-tail orientation with the gene for lamin B2.

Interactions 

TIMM13 has been shown to interact with TIMM8A.

References

Further reading